Birgit C. Muller  is an Austrian fashion designer, producer, and philanthropist.

Career
Birgit C. Muller was born in Vienna, Austria and raised in Marbella, Spain. She resides in Beverly Hills, California and has worked in the film and television industry in the United States for Paramount, Sony, Disney and Universal Studios and others, with such noted directors as William Friedkin, David Lynch, Michael Bay, Francis Ford Coppola and Ridley Scott. She manufactures her own line of couture designer gowns, and is a philanthropist for various global humanitarian causes. Birgit Muller is a celebrity judge for the annual Christopher Guy Harrison BritWeek Design Award challenge. She is the brand ambassador for the British luxury furniture designer Christopher Guy Harrison. In addition; she is the Co-Executive Producer of Miss Liberty America, a reality show pageant promoting the Constitution, Liberty and the American Way.

Awards
 EMMY Nomination - 2011 Outstanding Achievement in Costume Design For A Drama Series; CBS The Bold and the Beautiful
 EMMY Winner - 2006 Outstanding Achievement in Costume Design For A Drama Series; CBS The Bold and the Beautiful
 EMMY Winner - 2005 Outstanding Achievement in Costume Design For A Drama Series; CBS "The Bold and the Beautiful"
 EMMY Winner - 2004 Outstanding Achievement in Costume Design For A Drama Series; CBS "The Bold and the Beautiful"
 EMMY Nomination - 2003 Outstanding Achievement in Costume Design For A Drama Series; CBS "The Bold and the Beautiful"
 EMMY Nomination - 2002 Outstanding Achievement in Costume Design For A Drama Series; CBS "The Bold and the Beautiful"
 CIRCLE OF HOPE Award; 2005 (for Muller's efforts in helping raise more than $800,000.00 for the City of Hope National Medical Center)"

Philanthropic works

February 26, 2012 Children Uniting Nations Awards Celebration Honoring Metta World Peace Private Residence

February 26, 2012 How a Black Oscar dress goes Green

February 22, 2012 Global Green USA 9th Annual Pre-Oscar Event

May 29, 2010 - Birgit C. Muller Fashion Show Benefitting the Rally for Kids with Cancer Foundation chaired by Eva Longoria Parker.

March 13, 2010 Make-A-Wish Foundation UK and Eva Longoria's Hero's - Nobel Gift Gala in London, England.

2010 - "Red Carpet Couture" Event

2006 - Birgit founded “The Three Doves Foundation”, an organization to raise funds for natural disasters, disease prevention and cure.

2005 - City of Hope (raising money for cancer research)

References

External links

Miss Liberty America

1966 births
Living people
Austrian fashion designers
Austrian women fashion designers
Austrian philanthropists
Women philanthropists
Austrian television producers
Austrian women television producers
Austrian film producers
Austrian women film producers